The Trapp Family is a 1956 West German comedy drama film about the real-life Austrian musical family of that name directed by Wolfgang Liebeneiner and starring Ruth Leuwerik, Hans Holt, and Maria Holst. Based on Maria von Trapp's 1949 memoir, The Story of the Trapp Family Singers, the film is about a novice nun sent to care for the unruly children of a wealthy baron, who falls in love with and marries the young woman. Through her caring influence, the family becomes a famous singing group. When the baron is pressured to join Hitler's navy, the family escapes to the United States, where they establish themselves as singers.

The Trapp Family became one of the most successful German films of the 1950s and was the inspiration for the even more fictionalized 1959 Broadway musical The Sound of Music, and its highly successful 1965 film version. The film had one sequel, The Trapp Family in America (1958).

Plot
At a convent in Austria in the 1930s, a spirited novice named Maria (Ruth Leuwerik) is sent by her abbess to the estate of a widowed naval hero, Baron von Trapp (Hans Holt), to look after his seven unruly children. The baron is a stern disciplinarian and runs his household like a ship. When Maria arrives, she encourages the children to play games like other kids, and teaches them how to sing. When the baron discovers how Maria is ignoring his orders, he sends her back to the convent. Later, when he hears his children singing songs they've learned from Maria, his feelings for her change. Gradually, the baron falls in love with the young woman and proposes marriage.

After obtaining permission to marry from the abbess, Maria becomes the Baroness von Trapp. The family's priest, Dr. Franz Wasner (Josef Meinrad), encourages Maria and the children to sing for charity, and soon they develop a large following. After the Nazis annex Austria, the baron loses his fortune and is summoned to serve in the German navy. Unwilling to live under the Nazi regime, the family flee to the United States, where they continue performing. But their troubles are far from over when a naïve Maria tells the immigration inspector they want to stay forever, after he asks how long they will be visiting the country.

Cast

Production
The film is based on Maria von Trapp's memoir, The Story of the Trapp Family Singers, written in 1948 to help promote her family's singing group following the death of her husband, Captain von Trapp, in 1947. Hollywood producers expressed immediate interest in purchasing the title only, but Maria refused, wanting her entire story to be told. In 1956, German producer Wolfgang Liebeneiner offered her $10,000 (equal to $ today for the complete rights to her story. Following her lawyer's advice, she asked for a share of the film profits, but was told that German law prohibited a German film company from paying royalties to non-German citizens—Maria was an American citizen by then. She signed away the rights to her story without confirming that such a law existed (it did not). The same agent that misled her offered her a single cash payment if she would accept $9,000, which she did.

Liebeneiner brought in George Hurdalek and Herbert Reinecker to write the screenplay, and Franz Grothe to supervise the soundtrack, which included traditional Austrian folk songs. The movie was filmed on location in Salzburg, Austria, and Murnau am Staffelsee in Bavaria, West Germany.

Release
The Trapp Family was released in West Germany on October 9, 1956, by Gloria Film and became a major success. Two years later, Liebeneiner directed a sequel, The Trapp Family in America, and the two films soon became the most successful films in West Germany during the post-war years. Their success extended throughout Europe and South America.

Critical response
In his review of the 1961 United States version for The New York Times, Howard Thompson gave the film a positive review, calling it "genteel, tuneful and frankly sentimental". According to Thompson, the film "steers an undramatic, but disarming, course", with "friendly" acting and "pretty" cinematography. The central attraction for Thompson, however, is the traditional folk music:

Thompson concludes, "The children will love it. Nobody, certainly, will resent such a happy family, content to love one another and, thank heaven, to sing."

Adaptations
In 1956, Paramount Pictures purchased the United States film rights, intending to produce an English-language version with Audrey Hepburn as Maria. The studio eventually dropped its option, but one of its directors, Vincent Donehue, proposed the story as a stage musical for Mary Martin. Producers Richard Halliday and Leland Heyward secured the rights and hired playwrights Howard Lindsay and Russel Crouse, who had won a Pulitzer Prize for State of the Union. They approached Richard Rodgers and Oscar Hammerstein to compose one song for the musical, but the composers felt the two styles—traditional Austrian folk songs and their composition—would not work, and offered to write a new score for the entire production. The Sound of Music opened on November 16, 1959, at the Lunt-Fontanne Theatre in New York City and ran on Broadway for 1,443 performances, winning six Tony Awards, including Best Musical.

In June 1960, 20th Century Fox purchased the film rights to the Broadway musical for $1.25 million (equal to $ today) against 10% of the gross, and at that time, also purchased the rights to the two German films for distribution in the United States. 20th Century Fox combined the two German films, Die Trapp-Familie and Die Trapp-Familie in Amerika, hired Lee Kresel to dub the films in English, and released them as a single 106-minute film titled The Trapp Family on April 19, 1961.

Fox released the better-known film version of the Rodgers and Hammerstein play, starring Julie Andrews, on March 2, 1965.

References
Citations

Sources

Further reading

External links
 
 

1956 films
1950s biographical films
Films about music and musicians
Films directed by Wolfgang Liebeneiner
Films set in Austria
Films set in the 1920s
Films set in the 1930s
German biographical films
Trapp family
West German films
Films about Catholic nuns
20th Century Fox films
1950s German films
Foreign films set in the United States